We Are Glitter is a remix album by English electronic duo Goldfrapp. It was released in North America on 17 October 2006 by Mute Records. The album features remixes of songs from the band's third studio album, Supernature (2005), many of which were previously unavailable in North America.

Chart performance
We Are Glitter debuted at number eight on the US Billboard Top Electronic Albums chart on 4 November 2006, spending four weeks on the chart. The album also peaked at number forty-eight on both the Billboard Top Heatseekers and Top Independent Albums charts.

Track listing

Personnel

 Alison Goldfrapp – vocals, synthesiser, producer, arranger, engineer (all tracks); remix (track 12); art direction
 Will Gregory – synthesiser, producer, arranger, engineer (all tracks); remix (track 12)
 Alle Benassi – remix (track 3)
 Benny Benassi – remix (tracks 3, 13)
 Alan Braxe – remix (track 6)
 Eric Broucek – assistant (track 11)
 Carl Craig – remix (track 7)
 The DFA – remix (track 11)
 The Flaming Lips – remix (track 5)
 Fred Falke – remix (track 6)
 Ted Jensen – mastering (track 12)
 François K – remix (track 10)

 Ross Kirton – photography
 Eric Kupper – keyboards, remix (track 10)
 Mat Maitland – art direction
 Mike Marsh – mastering (track 9)
 Kevin Metcalfe – mastering (track 11)
 Filippo Moscatello – additional programming (track 8)
 múm – remix (tracks 4, 9)
 Ewan Pearson – remix, engineer, mixing (track 8)
 Chris Potter – mastering (tracks 1–8, 10)
 T. Raumschmiere – remix (track 2)
 Rob Rives – drum programming (track 10)
 Gerard Saint – art direction
 The Shortwave Set – remix (track 1)

Charts

Release history

References

External links
 Goldfrapp.com

2006 remix albums
Goldfrapp compilation albums
Mute Records remix albums
Albums produced by Fred Falke